Great Expectations – The Singles Collection is a compilation album of British rock band New Model Army's singles, released in 2003. The album was released only in the United States.

Track listing
"Great Expectations" (Justin Sullivan, Stuart Morrow) – 3:15
"The Price" (Sullivan, Morrow) – 3:27
"No Rest" (Sullivan, Heaton, Morrow) – 3:52
"Better Than Them" (7" version) (Sullivan, Heaton) – 3:10
"Brave New World" (Sullivan, Heaton, Jason Harris, Joolz Denby) – 3:26
"51st State" (Ashley Cartwright, New Model Army) – 2:34
"Poison Street" (extended mix) (Sullivan, Heaton) – 4:05
"White Coats" (Sullivan, Heaton, Harris) – 4:17
"Stupid Questions" (Sullivan) – 3:29
"Vagabonds" (album version) (Sullivan) – 5:23
"Green and Grey" (edit) (Sullivan, Heaton) – 4:57
"Get Me Out" (Sullivan, Heaton) – 3:19
"Purity" (US edit) (Sullivan) – 4:11
"Here Comes the War" (Sullivan, Heaton, Nelson) – 4:29
"Living in the Rose" (Sullivan, Heaton) – 3:52
"Wonderful Way to Go" (single mix) (Sullivan, Heaton) – 4:38
"You Weren't There" (Sullivan) – 3:36
"Orange Tree Roads" (Sullivan) – 3:55

References

External links
The official New Model Army website

New Model Army (band) compilation albums
2003 compilation albums